Sarisophora is a genus of moths in the family Lecithoceridae.

Species
 Sarisophora beckerina Park, 2012
 Sarisophora brachymita (Turner, 1919)
 Sarisophora chlaenota Meyrick, 1904
 Sarisophora cyanostigmatis Park, 2012
 Sarisophora cyclonitis (Meyrick, 1904)
 Sarisophora dactylisana Wu, 1994
 Sarisophora designata Park, 2012
 Sarisophora dispila (Turner, 1919)
 Sarisophora hadroides Park, 2012
 Sarisophora idonea Wu, 1994
 Sarisophora leptoglypta Meyrick, 1904
 Sarisophora leucoscia Turner, 1919
 Sarisophora lygrophthalma Meyrick, 1934
 Sarisophora melanotata Park, 2012
 Sarisophora neptigota Wu, 1994
 Sarisophora notornis Park, 2012
 Sarisophora nyctiphylax Turner, 1919
 Sarisophora praecentrix Meyrick, 1931
 Sarisophora ptochomorpha Meyrick, 1923
 Sarisophora pycnospila Turner, 1919
 Sarisophora pyrrhotata Park, 2012
 Sarisophora tamiodes Meyrick, 1910

References

 
Lecithocerinae
Moth genera